Ram Ouédraogo (born January 2, 1950) is a Burkinabé politician and leader of the Rally of the Ecologists of Burkina (RDEB) party.

Ouédraogo was born in Agboville, Côte d'Ivoire, to Burkinabé parents from Passoré Province. He ran as the candidate of the Union of Greens for the Development of Burkina (UVDB) in the presidential election held on 15 November 1998, placing second behind incumbent Blaise Compaoré with 6.61% of the vote. He later quit the UVDB and founded the RDEB party.

From 1999 to 2002, Ouédraogo served in the government as Minister of State for National Reconciliation.

In the 13 November 2005 presidential election, Ouédraogo placed fifth out of 13 candidates, receiving 2.04% of the vote.

References

1950 births
Living people
Rally of the Ecologists of Burkina politicians
People from Agboville
Government ministers of Burkina Faso
21st-century Burkinabé people